The 2017 Star Sports Greyhound Derby took place during June and July and the final was held on 1 July 2017 at Towcester Greyhound Stadium. 

It was the first time since 1984 that the event was held away from Wimbledon Stadium and the first time in its history that it was held outside of London. The competition was sponsored by bookmaker Star Sports for the first time with a winner's prize of £175,000. The winner was Astute Missile who was the outsider at 28-1,  his owner Geoff Hill won £175,000.

Final 
At Towcester (over 500 metres):

Distances 
¾, 4½, 1¼, 1¾, ½ (lengths)
The distances between the greyhounds are in finishing order and shown in lengths. One length is equal to 0.08 of one second.

Race Report
Astute Missile broke very well from the traps alongside Hiya Butt, who produced his trademark early pace, to lead from the first bend until the third bend. Astute Missile then forced his way inside Hiya Butt at the third bend, the latter received a small bump at this stage and then tired into last place. Astute Missile went on to win from a strong finishing Tyrur Shay and the previously unbeaten Clares Rocket finished third after failing to make the fast start that was expected of him.

Semi finals

Quarter finals

See also 
 2017 UK & Ireland Greyhound Racing Year

References

Greyhound Derby
English Greyhound Derby
English Greyhound Derby
English Greyhound Derby
English Greyhound Derby
Sport in Northamptonshire